Jahar Das (born 5 April 1947) is a former Indian football player and current manager. During his playing days, Das appeared with Mohun Bagan in the seventies.

Playing career
Born in West Bengal, Das had played for Port Commissioner and Mohun Bagan as a striker.

Coaching career
Das began his coaching career managing the West Bengal football team in the Santosh Trophy. He then managed Bengal Mumbai FC from 2002 to 2003. He also had a spell as coach of the India under-17 side. In 2005, after the departure of Sukhwinder Singh, Das was reportedly one of the candidates put up for the vacant India senior head coach position. The position was eventually given to Syed Nayeemuddin.

On 7 December 2005, Das was given the head coaching job at National Football League side, Mohun Bagan. His first match in charge came in the club's opening NFL game of the season against Mahindra United, a 0–0 draw. Das was eventually relieved of his duties on 6 March 2006 after Mohun Bagan found themselves in ninth place in the NFL table. Das would return to his previous post at Mohun Bagan as the technical director of their academy.

On 20 August 2015 it was announced that Das would become the "Head of Youth Development" at newly promoted I-League club, Aizawl. Then, on 7 February 2016, after Aizawl sacked head coach, Manuel Retamero Fraile, Das was announced as the new head coach.

Peerless SC created history after winning the 2019–20 Calcutta Premier Division, defeating the three Kolkata giants. The club managed by Jahar Das emerged as the first small side since 1958 to win the Calcutta Football League top division.

References

External links
 All India Football Federation Profile

1947 births
Living people
Footballers from West Bengal
Mohun Bagan AC players
Association football forwards
Indian footballers
Indian football managers
Mohun Bagan AC managers
Aizawl FC managers